Blastobasis fatigata is a moth in the  family Blastobasidae. It is found in South Africa.

The length of the forewings is 6 mm. The forewings have pale greyish brown scales, tipped with white and intermixed with a few brown scales and brown scales tipped with white. The hindwings are pale brown, gradually darkening towards the apex.

References

Endemic moths of South Africa
Moths described in 1914
Blastobasis
Moths of Africa